Nimoa, or Rifao, is an Oceanic language of Papua New Guinea, spoken on Nimoa and neighboring islands.

References 

Papuan Tip languages
Languages of Milne Bay Province